The Journey is a studio album released by the country/gospel group The Oak Ridge Boys. The album was released on July 27, 2004.

Track listing

"Train, Train" (Benny Boling, Dusty Drake, Jerry VanDiver) - 2:44
"Someplace Green" (Pat Terry) - 4:00
"Bad Case of Missing You" (Al Anderson, Bob DiPiero, Jeffrey Steele) - 4:04
"Saving Grace" (Jerry Salley, Charles Wilburn) - 4:35
"You Don't Have to Go Home (But You Can't Stay Here)" (Larry Cordle, Jerry Salley, Larry Shell) - 3:10
"Old Familiar Love" (Tom Fisch, Roy Hurtd) - 3:41
"Goin' Against the Grain" (Bruce Bouton, Larry Cordle, Carl Jackson) - 2:33
"I Love You So Much It Hurts" (Floyd Tillman) - 3:06
"My Girl Friday" (Carl Jackson, Curtis Wright) - 3:40
"That Ole Gravel Road Was Easy Street" (Billy Lawson, Roger Murrah) - 3:26
"The Journey" (Joe Bonsall) - 5:27

Awards

In 2004, The Journey was nominated for a Dove Award for Country Album of the Year at the 36th GMA Dove Awards.

References

External links
The Journey at Amazon.com

2005 albums
The Oak Ridge Boys albums